Henrik Larsson (born November 16, 1971) is a Swedish professional wheelchair pool player from Malmo, Sweden. Larsson is a five-time WPA World Nine-ball Championship winner, WPA World Eight-ball Championship winner and 12-time European Pool Championship winner.

References

External links

Swedish pool players
Living people
Swedish sportspeople
1971 births